Bellview is an unincorporated community located in Curry County, New Mexico, United States.

Description
New Mexico State Road 241 runs east–west through town. Bellview had its own post office until it closed on April 22, 1995. Today, the town is mostly abandoned and approaching ghost-town status.

See also

 List of ghost towns in New Mexico

References

External links

 Public domain photos of the Llano Estacado and Eastern New Mexico

Unincorporated communities in Curry County, New Mexico
Unincorporated communities in New Mexico